Guidelines for the Conduct of the Troops in Russia was a "criminal order" issued on June 4th, 1941, during World War II. The guidelines detailed the expected behaviour of German troops during the Invasion of the Soviet Union. Civilians were included as opposition groups. The order states "Bolshevism is the deadly enemy of the National Socialist German people. This corrosive Weltanschauung – and those who support it – are what Germany’s struggle is against. This struggle demands a ruthless and strenuous crackdown on Bolshevik agitators, irregulars, saboteurs and Jews, and the complete elimination of both active and passive resistance. The Asiatic soldiers, in particular, are inscrutable, unpredictable, underhand and unfeeling".

Omer Bartov writes that the Guidelines for the Conduct of the Troops in Russia detailed "ruthless measures against Bolshevik agitators, guerrillas, saboteurs and Jews, and called for the complete elimination of any active or passive resistance".

Wade Beorn writing in Marching into Darkness notes that the order targets Jews explicitly as "racial enemies to be eliminated by the military regardless of their behavior".

References

Bibliography
 
 
 

Military history of Germany during World War II
Military history of the Soviet Union during World War II
Eastern Front (World War II)
Orders by Adolf Hitler
Nazi war crimes
War crimes of the Wehrmacht
Anti-communism in Germany
1941 documents
Nazi war crimes in Russia